Berezovo is a rural locality (a village) in Nyuksenskoye Rural Settlement, Nyuksensky District, Vologda Oblast, Russia. The population was 85 as of 2002. There are 2 streets.

Geography 
Berezovo is located 19 km northeast of Nyuksenitsa (the district's administrative centre) by road. Norovo is the nearest rural locality.

References 

Rural localities in Nyuksensky District